The men's 110 metres hurdles event at the 1967 Summer Universiade was held at the National Olympic Stadium in Tokyo on 31 August and 1 September 1967.

Medalists

Results

Heats

Final

Wind: -0.3 m/s

References

Athletics at the 1967 Summer Universiade
1967